
Year 159 BC was a year of the pre-Julian Roman calendar. At the time it was known as the Year of the Consulship of Dolabella and Nobilior (or, less frequently, year 595 Ab urbe condita) and the Fifth Year of Houyuan. The denomination 159 BC for this year has been used since the early medieval period, when the Anno Domini calendar era became the prevalent method in Europe for naming years.

Events 
 By place 

 Seleucid Empire 
 With the Seleucid victory in Judea over the Maccabees, Alcimus is re-established as the High Priest of Israel, and a strong force is left in Jerusalem to support him. However, he does not enjoy his triumph for long, as he dies soon after from a paralytic stroke.

 Bactria 
 While Eucratides I is in north west India to claim possession of the previous Bactrian King Demetrius I's territory there, the Parthians, under Mithradates I, annex two Bactrian provinces. Returning from India to reconquer them, Eucratides is murdered by his son.

Births 
 Quintus Mucius Scaevola Augur, politician of the Roman Republic and an early authority on Roman law (d. 88 BC) (approximate date)

Deaths 
 Charops of Epirus, ruler of Epirus.
 Alcimus, high priest of Judea.
 Eucratides I, king of Bactria, who has reigned since around 170 BC.
 Eumenes II, king of Pergamon.
 Publius Terentius Afer (Terence), Roman comic dramatist, the author of six verse comedies that are long regarded as models of pure Latin (b. c. 195 BC) (approximate date).

References